Brigadier Harcharan Singh, VSM (born January 15, 1950) is an Indian field hockey player. He was a member of bronze medal winner India men's national field hockey team at the 1972 Summer Olympics in Munich.

Early life, Education and Army
He was born in Marar, Gurdaspur, Punjab. He joined the Indian Army, long after he began playing hockey in 1969. Singh explains, “I joined the Army quite late. The reason being my lack of fluency in English. I studied at the Khalsa Government school in rural Punjab. To qualify to an officer in the Services, one must be fluent in English. I picked up the language but struggled a lot to move up the ranks in the early stages of my career in the army..

Field Hockey
Singh was member of India men's national field hockey team which won Bronze in 1972 Summer Olympics held in Munich. Singh was also member of Indian Hockey Team which won Bronze in 1971 Barcelona Hockey World Cup, Silver in 1973 Amsterdam Hockey World Cup and Gold in 1975 Kuala Lumpur Hockey World Cup. In Asian Games Singh's team won Silver medals in 1970 Asian Games held in Bangkok and 1974 Asian Games held in Tehran. Singh also competed at the 1976 Summer Olympics.

Awards
Singh was awarded Arjuna Award in 1977. He was awarded Vishisht Seva Medal for distinguished services to the nation while serving in the Army in 1981, the Maharaja Ranjit Singh Award by the Punjab Government in 2019 which acknowledged him as a Punjab sports legend and the Sri Guru Nanak Dev Ji Achiever’s Award among 400 prominent Punjabis globally, also in 2019 by Capt. Amarinder Singh on the occasion of 550th Prakash Purb celebrations of Sri Guru Nanak Dev Ji.

References

External links

1950 births
Living people
Olympic field hockey players of India
Field hockey players at the 1972 Summer Olympics
Field hockey players at the 1976 Summer Olympics
Indian male field hockey players
Olympic bronze medalists for India
Olympic medalists in field hockey
Asian Games medalists in field hockey
Field hockey players at the 1970 Asian Games
Field hockey players at the 1974 Asian Games
Field hockey players from Punjab, India
Medalists at the 1972 Summer Olympics
Asian Games silver medalists for India
Medalists at the 1970 Asian Games
Medalists at the 1974 Asian Games
Recipients of the Arjuna Award